Hugill & Blatherwick was an architectural firm in Sioux Falls, South Dakota that was founded by George C. Hugill and Wilfred F. Blatherwick circa 1921.  A number of their works are listed on the U.S. National Register of Historic Places.

Works (with attribution variations) include:
Clark County Courthouse, 200 N. Commercial St. Clark, SD (Hugill & Blatherwick), NRHP-listed
Josephine Martin Glidden Memorial Chapel, 2121 E. Twelfth St. Sioux Falls, SD (Hugill & Blatherwick), NRHP-listed
Hughes County Courthouse, Capitol Ave. between Grand and Euclid Aves. Pierre, SD (Hugill & Blatherwick), NRHP-listed
Lake County Courthouse, Center St. between Harth and Lee Aves. Madison, SD (Hugill & Blatherwick), NRHP-listed
Lake Preston High School, 300 1st St., NE Lake Preston, SD (Hugill & Blatherwick), NRHP-listed
LaSalle Apartments, 703 S. Summit Sioux Falls, SD (Hugill & Blatherwick), NRHP-listed
Linden House (Vermillion, South Dakota), 509 Linden Ave. Vermillion, SD (Hugill, Blatherwick & Fritzel), NRHP-listed
Presentation Children's Home, 701 S. Western Ave. Sioux Falls, SD (Hugill & Blatherwick), NRHP-listed
Ziebach County Courthouse, Main St. between Second and Third Sts. Dupree, SD (Hugill & Blatherwick), NRHP-listed

References

Architecture firms of the United States
Architecture firms based in South Dakota